Morag Barbara Wise, Lady Wise,  (born 1963) is a Senator of the College of Justice, a judge of the Scotland's Supreme Courts.

Education
Wise obtained an LL.B (Hons) and Dip. L.P. the University of Aberdeen and LL.M from McGill University in Montreal.

Legal career
Wise became a solicitor in 1989 and joined Morton Fraser LLP. In 1993, she was called to the bar, joining Westwater Advocates, and specialised in family law. Wise became a Queen's Counsel in 2005, and was appointed a Temporary Judge of the Court of Session in 2008. On 6 February 2013, she was appointed a Senator of the College of Justice, taking the judicial title Lady Wise.

In 2005, Wise became a member of the Disciplinary Committee of the Faculty of Advocates She became chair of the Advocates' Family Law Association in 2007, having served as vice chair since 2000.

On 7 December 2021, it was announced that Wise had been appointed to the Inner House of the Court of Session with effect from 5 January 2022.  She was appointed to Her Majesty's Privy Council on 12 April 2022 allowing her the honorific The Right Honourable.

References

Living people
Alumni of the University of Aberdeen
McGill University Faculty of Law alumni
Scottish King's Counsel
Wise
Scottish women judges
21st-century King's Counsel
Members of the Privy Council of the United Kingdom
Members of the Faculty of Advocates
Scottish solicitors
1963 births